Stefan Koubek was the defending champion but lost in the second round to Hyung-Taik Lee.

Nicolas Escudé won in the final 6–3, 7–6(7–4) against Ivan Ljubičić.

Seeds

  Andy Roddick (second round)
  Rainer Schüttler (first round)
  Mark Philippoussis (first round)
  Sébastien Grosjean (quarterfinals)
  Nicolás Massú (first round)
  Younes El Aynaoui (first round)
  Tim Henman (semifinals)
  Agustín Calleri (semifinals)

Draw

Finals

Top half

Bottom half

References
 2004 Qatar Open Main Draw

2004 Qatar Open
Singles
Qatar Open (tennis)